Bill Shenfield (25 April 1910 – 13 October 1978) was an  Australian rules footballer who played with North Albany, South Fremantle in the West Australian Football League (WAFL), Fitzroy in the Victorian Football League (VFL) and the Coburg and Northcote Football Clubs in the Victorian Football Association (VFA).

Notes

External links 
		

1910 births
1978 deaths
Australian rules footballers from Western Australia
Fitzroy Football Club players
South Fremantle Football Club players
Coburg Football Club players
Northcote Football Club players